The 1994 Montreal Expos season was the 26th season of the franchise. They had the best record in Major League Baseball (74-40), when the 1994–95 Major League Baseball strike ended the season and the team's postseason aspirations.  From June 1 forward, Montreal transformed into the dominant club in the league, going 46−18 until the strike.  In turn, they also produced the most successful season in franchise history in terms of winning percentage (.649, which would've been 105-57 in a full season). Five Expos represented the National League at the All-Star Game held in Pittsburgh, including Moisés Alou, who had the game-winning hit for the National League.

Offseason
 November 19, 1993: Delino DeShields was traded by the Expos to the Los Angeles Dodgers for Pedro Martínez.
 December 13, 1993: The Expos traded a player to be named later to the Cleveland Indians for Randy Milligan. The Expos completed the deal by sending Brian Barnes to the Indians on December 17.
 March 31, 1994: John Vander Wal was purchased from the Expos by the Colorado Rockies.

Spring training

The Expos held spring training at West Palm Beach Municipal Stadium in West Palm Beach, Florida – a facility they shared with the Atlanta Braves. It was their 18th season at the stadium; they had conducted spring training there from 1969 to 1972 and since 1981.

Regular season

Opening Day starters
 Moisés Alou
 Sean Berry
 Wil Cordero
 Darrin Fletcher
 Cliff Floyd
 Marquis Grissom
 Mike Lansing
 Pedro Martínez
 Larry Walker

Summary
On April 13, 1994, Pedro Martínez took a perfect game through 7 innings versus the Cincinnati Reds until throwing a brushback pitch at Reggie Sanders led Sanders to immediately charge the mound, starting a bench-clearing brawl. Martínez ended up with a no-decision in the game, which the Expos eventually won 3–2.

One amusing moment occurred on April 24 while playing the Dodgers at Dodger Stadium in Los Angeles.  With one out in the third inning, right fielder Larry Walker caught a Mike Piazza fly ball and innocently handed it to young fan, six year old Sebastian Napier, thinking it was the third out of the inning.  He noticed that José Offerman, already on base, was running at full speed.  Walker managed to retrieve the ball from Napier, and held Offerman to third base.  Embarrassed, Walker remarked that he "told the little kid that maybe next time I'll give him a ball when there are three outs instead of two. Everybody around him was laughing."  Where Offerman was stationed made little difference as Tim Wallach homered on the next pitch, from Martínez, for two runs.  True to his word, when the Expos assumed the field in the bottom half of the fourth inning, Walker gave Napier a signed ball, inducing a standing ovation.

The National League suspended Walker four games starting June 24 for inciting a bench-clearing brawl by charging the mound in a game against Pittsburgh.

The Expos team appeared to be reaching its potential in 1994.  After June 1, Montreal transformed into the dominant club in the National League, going 46−18 until the players' strike halted the season on August 11.  In turn, they produced the most successful season in franchise history as they attained a major league best 74−40 record. on pace for a 106-win season

Led by an ensemble of rising young stars including Martínez, Walker, Moisés Alou, Cliff Floyd, Mike Lansing and Jeff Fassero, the Expos scored 585 runs (5.13 per game) and allowed 454 runs (3.98 per game) through 114 games by Friday, August 12. Their 1994 pitching staff was very nearly as good as that of their division rivals, the Atlanta Braves, as the Expos finished the strike-shortened season with an MLB-best 3.56 ERA, an MLB-high 46 saves and just 288 walks, the fewest in the Majors.

Walker, with 86 RBIs, was well on his way to his first 100-RBI year; Ken Hill was on pace to win 23 games while Pedro Martínez was on pace to strike out more than 200 batters. Moisés Alou was hitting .339 and on pace to collect more than 200 hits for the first time in his career. Marquis Grissom was on pace to score 137 runs. Two other Expos, namely Alou and Walker, were also on pace to score more than 100 runs. The team was also drawing well at home: through 52 home games in 1994, 1,276,250 fans had attended Expos games, for an average of 24,543 per game. At that pace, the Expos would have had a good chance of drawing two million fans for the first time since 1983. The season, however, was stopped due to the 1994 players' strike. The World Series, for which the Expos appeared to be destined, was never played and Montreal lost many of its players during the next season due to free agency and salary constraints and the team never recovered. The 1994 Montreal Expos team that could have been remains one of baseball's hot discussion points. The franchise would never reach the playoffs as the Expos again. The collapse of the Expos would eventually lead to the franchise's move to Washington, D.C., for the 2005 season to become the Washington Nationals.

When baseball returned for an exhibition series in Olympic Stadium in March 2014, the team was honored during a pregame ceremony, along with a banner with the words On se souvient Édition 1994 (We remember the 1994 season).

Game log

|-  style="text-align:center; background:#fbb;"
| 1 || April 4 || @ Astros || 5–6 (12 inn.) || Edens (1–0) || Shaw (0–1) || || 43,440 || 0–1 || Boxscore  
|-  style="text-align:center; background:#bfb;"
| 2 || April 5 || @ Astros || 5–1 || Hill (1–0) || Drabek (0–1) || || 16,227 || 1–1 || Boxscore  
|-  style="text-align:center; background:#bfb;"
| 3 || April 6 || @ Astros || 9–3 || Rueter (1–0) || Kile (0–1) || || 17,180 || 2–1 || Boxscore  
|-  style="text-align:center; background:#fbb;"
| 4 || April 8 || Cubs || 0–4 || Trachsel (1–0) || Martínez (0–1) || || 47,001 || 2–2 || Boxscore
|-  style="text-align:center; background:#fbb;"
| 5 || April 9 || Cubs || 3–4 || Plesac (1–0) || Wetteland (0–1) || Myers (1) || 38,635 || 2–3 || Boxscore
|-  style="text-align:center; background:#bfb;"
| 6 || April 10 || Cubs || 8–2 || Hill (2–0) || Guzmán (0–2) || || 16,183 || 3–3 || Boxscore
|-  style="text-align:center; background:#fbb;"
| 7 || April 11 || Reds || 4–9 (11 inn.) || Carrasco (3–0) || Heredia (0–1) || || 12,526 || 3–4 || Boxscore
|-  style="text-align:center; background:#fbb;"
| 8 || April 12 || Reds || 1–7 || Pugh (1–0) || Boucher (0–1) || || 12,466 || 3–5 || Boxscore
|-  style="text-align:center; background:#bfb;"
| 9 || April 13 || Reds || 3–2 || Wetteland (1–1) || McElroy (0–1) || || 14,072 || 4–5 || Boxscore
|-  style="text-align:center; background:#fbb;"
| 10 || April 15 || @ Rockies || 2–9 || Reynoso (1–1) || Fassero (0–1) || || 47,213 || 4–6 || Boxscore
|-  style="text-align:center; background:#fbb;"
| 11 || April 16 || @ Rockies || 3–7 || Reed (1–1) || Hill (2–1) || || 51,347 || 4–7 || Boxscore
|-  style="text-align:center; background:#fbb;"
| 12 || April 17 || @ Rockies || 5–6 (10 inn.) || Munoz (1–1) || Heredia (0–2) || || 55,443 || 4–8 || Boxscore
|-  style="text-align:center; background:#fbb;"
| 13 || April 18 || @ Giants || 1–2 (11 inn.) || Jackson (1–0) || Scott (0–1) || || 16,502 || 4–9 || Boxscore
|-  style="text-align:center; background:#bfb;"
| 14 || April 19 || @ Giants || 4–3 || Rojas (1–0) || Burba (0–1) || || 14,474 || 5–9 || Boxscore
|-  style="text-align:center; background:#bfb;"
| 15 || April 20 || @ Padres || 4–2 || Fassero (1–1) || Sanders (1–2) || Rojas (1) || 7,095 || 6–9 || Boxscore
|-  style="text-align:center; background:#bfb;"
| 16 || April 21 || @ Padres || 5–4 || Hill (3–1) || Whitehurst (1–3) || Rojas (2) || 11,420 || 7–9 || Boxscore
|-  style="text-align:center; background:#bfb;"
| 17 || April 22 || @ Dodgers || 7–6 || Shaw (1–1) || Candiotti (3–1) || Rojas (3) || 36,434 || 8–9 || Boxscore
|-  style="text-align:center; background:#bfb;"
| 18 || April 23 || @ Dodgers || 8–6 (11 inn.) || Scott (1–0) || McDowell (0–1) || Rojas (4) || 39,157 || 9–9 || Boxscore
|-  style="text-align:center; background:#fbb;"
| 19 || April 24 || @ Dodgers || 1–7 || Astacio (1–2) || Martínez (0–2) || || 38,817 || 9–10 || Boxscore
|-  style="text-align:center; background:#bfb;"
| 20 || April 26 || Giants || 7–3 || Fassero (2–1) || Swift (3–2) || Rojas (5) || 14,642 || 10–10 || Boxscore
|-  style="text-align:center; background:#bfb;"
| 21 || April 27 || Giants || 7–1 || Hill (4–1) || Portugal (2–2) || || 11,605 || 11–10 || Boxscore
|-  style="text-align:center; background:#bfb;"
| 22 || April 29 || Padres || 3–1 || Rueter (2–0) || Benes (1–5) || Rojas (6) || 15,114 || 12–10 || Boxscore
|-  style="text-align:center; background:#bfb;"
| 23 || April 30 || Padres || 5–3 || Martínez (1–2) || Sager (0–2) || Rojas (7) || 18,314 || 13–10 || Boxscore
|-

|-  style="text-align:center; background:#bfb;"
| 24 || May 1 || Padres || 3–2 (11 inn.) || Shaw (2–1) || Mauser (1–2) || || 20,626 || 14–10 || Boxscore
|-  style="text-align:center; background:#bfb;"
| 25 || May 2 || Dodgers || 10–5 || Hill (5–1) || Gross (0–1) || Rojas (8) || 13,262 || 15–10 || Boxscore
|-  style="text-align:center; background:#fbb;"
| 26 || May 3 || Dodgers || 4–10 || Hershiser (2–0) || Henderson (0–1) || || 15,413 || 15–11 || Boxscore
|-  style="text-align:center; background:#bfb;"
| 27 || May 4 || Dodgers || 5–4 || Rojas (2–0) || Worrell (2–2) || || 16,875 || 16–11 || Boxscore
|-  style="text-align:center; background:#fbb;"
| 28 || May 6 || @ Braves || 0–5 || Maddux (5–2) || Martínez (1–3) || || 48,808 || 16–12 || Boxscore
|-  style="text-align:center; background:#fbb;"
| 29 || May 7 || @ Braves || 1–2 || Glavine (3–3) || Fassero (2–2) || || 49,157 || 16–13 || Boxscore
|-  style="text-align:center; background:#bfb;"
| 30 || May 8 || @ Braves || 1–0 || Hill (6–1) || Smoltz (2–4) || Wetteland (1) || 48,742 || 17–13 || Boxscore
|-  style="text-align:center; background:#fbb;"
| 31 || May 9 || Mets || 4–5 || Mason (2–1) || Rojas (2–1) || Franco (8) || 13,194 || 17–14 || Boxscore
|-  style="text-align:center; background:#fbb;"
| 32 || May 10 || Mets || 2–3 (10 inn.) || Linton (4–0) || Wetteland (1–2) || || 13,158 || 17–15 || Boxscore
|-  style="text-align:center; background:#bfb;"
| 33 || May 11 || Mets || 4–3 || Martínez (2–3) || Smith (2–4) || Rojas (9) || 18,511 || 18–15 || Boxscore
|-  style="text-align:center; background:#bfb;"
| 34 || May 13 || Cardinals || 9–1 || Fassero (3–2) || Palacios (0–2) || Wetteland (2) || 19,427 || 19–15 || Boxscore
|-  style="text-align:center; background:#fbb;"
| 35 || May 14 || Cardinals || 3–6 || Cormier (2–1) || Hill (6–2) || Pérez (7) || 18,181 || 19-16 || Boxscore
|-  style="text-align:center; background:#bfb;"
| 36 || May 15 || Cardinals || 9–8 || Wetteland (2–2) || Rodriguez (1–2) || || 30,471 || 20–16 || Boxscore
|-  style="text-align:center; background:#bfb;"
| 37 || May 16 || @ Phillies || 4–1 || Henry (1–0) || Schilling (0–7) || Rojas (10) || 28,236 || 21–16 || Boxscore
|-  style="text-align:center; background:#fbb;"
| 38 || May 17 || @ Phillies || 5–6 || Jones (2–1) || Wetteland (2–3) || || 36,233 || 21–17 || Boxscore
|-  style="text-align:center; background:#bfb;"
| 39 || May 18 || @ Phillies || 6–1 || Fassero (4–2) || Jackson (5–1) || || 41,032 || 22–17 || Boxscore
|-  style="text-align:center; background:#bfb;"
| 40 || May 20 || @ Pirates || 5–3 || Hill (7–2) || Peña (1–1) || Wetteland (3) || 30,804 || 23–17 || Boxscore
|-  style="text-align:center; background:#fbb;"
| 41 || May 21 || @ Pirates || 0–6 || Lieber (1–1) || Rueter (2-–1) || || 28,022 || 23–18 || Boxscore
|-  style="text-align:center; background:#bfb;"
| 42 || May 22 || @ Pirates || 3–2 || Martínez (3–3) || Neagle (4-5) || Wetteland (4) || 39,037 || 24–18 || Boxscore
|-  style="text-align:center; background:#fbb;"
| 43 || May 23 || @ Marlins || 2–3 || Rapp (3–1) || Fassero (4–3) || Nen (2) || 30,508 || 24–19 || Boxscore
|-  style="text-align:center; background:#bfb;"
| 44 || May 24 || @ Marlins || 11–1 || Henry (2–0) || Hough (4–3) || || 26,598 || 25–19 || Boxscore
|-  style="text-align:center; background:#bfb;"
| 45 || May 25 || @ Marlins || 3–1 || Hill (8–2) || Gardner (1–2) || Wetteland (5) || 25,025 || 26–19 || Boxscore
|-  style="text-align:center; background:#bfb;"
| 46 || May 27 || Rockies || 4–2 || White (1–0) || Painter (0–2) || Wetteland (6) || 22,882 || 27–19 || Boxscore
|-  style="text-align:center; background:#fbb;"
| 47 || May 28 || Rockies || 2–3 (10 inn.) || Ruffin (2–1) || Scott (1–2) || Bottenfield (1) || 30,452 || 27–20 || Boxscore
|-  style="text-align:center; background:#bfb;"
| 48 || May 29 || Rockies || 4–3 (10 inn.) || Scott (2–2) || Ruffin (2–2) || || 26,774 || 28–20 || Boxscore
|-  style="text-align:center; background:#fbb;"
| 49 || May 30 || @ Reds || 3–7 || Rijo (3–3) || Hill (8–3) || || 27,875 || 28–21 || Boxscore
|-  style="text-align:center; background:#fbb;"
| 50 || May 31 || @ Reds || 4–5 (13 inn.) || Schourek (3–0) || Shaw (2–2) || || 25,046 || 28–22 || Boxscore
|-

|-  style="text-align:center; background:#bfb;"
| 51 || June 1 || @ Reds || 10–9 || Scott (3–2) || Carrasco (3–2) || Martínez (1) || 23,653 || 29–22 || Boxscore
|-  style="text-align:center; background:#bfb;"
| 52 || June 3 || @ Cubs || 3–1 || Shaw (3–1) || Crim (2–1) || Wetteland (7) || 26,037 || 30–22 || Boxscore
|-  style="text-align:center; background:#bfb;"
| 53 || June 4 || @ Cubs || 6–1 || Martínez (4–4) || Banks (6–5) || || 37,187 || 31–22 || Boxscore
|-  style="text-align:center; background:#bfb;"
| 54 || June 5 || @ Cubs || 10–5 (13 inn.) || Heredia (1–2) || Otto (0–1) || || 34,181 || 32–22 || Boxscore
|-  style="text-align:center; background:#bfb;"
| 55 || June 6 || Astros || 10–5 || Henry (3–0) || Swindell (5–2) || Wetteland (8) || 14,322 || 33–22 || Boxscore
|-  style="text-align:center; background:#bfb;"
| 56 || June 7 || Astros || 3–2 || Heredia (2–2) || Veres (2–3) || Wetteland (9) || 17,283 || 34–22 || Boxscore
|-  style="text-align:center; background:#fbb;"
| 57 || June 8 || Astros || 2–9 || Williams (3–2) || Fassero (4–4) || || 17,289 || 34–23 || Boxscore
|-  style="text-align:center; background:#bfb;"
| 58 || June 9 || @ Mets || 9–0 || Martínez (5–4) || Gooden (2–2) || || 16,775 || 35–23 || Boxscore
|-  style="text-align:center; background:#bfb;"
| 59 || June 10 || @ Mets || 6–4 || Hill (9–3) || Jones (6–5) || Wetteland (10) || 19,924 || 36-23 || Boxscore
|-  style="text-align:center; background:#bfb;"
| 60 || June 11 || @ Mets || 7–4 || Heredia (3–2) || Gozzo (2–3) || Wetteland (11) || 29,307 || 37–23 || Boxscore
|-  style="text-align:center; background:#fbb;"
| 61 || June 12 || @ Mets || 4–5 || Manzanillo (1–1) || Rojas (2–2) || Franco (14) || 28,429 || 37–24 || Boxscore
|-  style="text-align:center; background:#bfb;"
| 62 || June 13 || Pirates || 10–2 || Fassero (5–4) || Neagle (6–7) || || 17,236 || 38–24 || Boxscore
|-  style="text-align:center; background:#bfb;"
| 63 || June 14 || Pirates || 12–7 || Martínez (6–4) || Smith (6–6) || Wetteland (12) || 15,781 || 39–24 || Boxscore
|-  style="text-align:center; background:#bfb;"
| 64 || June 15 || Pirates || 13–2 || Hill (10–3) || Wagner (4–5) || Henry (1) || 21,269 || 40–24 || Boxscore
|-  style="text-align:center; background:#fbb;"
| 65 || June 17 || Phillies || 8–10 || Quantrill (2–0) || Wetteland (2–4) || Jones (18) || 30,235 || 40–25 || Boxscore
|-  style="text-align:center; background:#fbb;"
| 66 || June 18 || Phillies || 4–8 || Jackson (9–1) || White (1–1) || || 28,354 || 40–26 || Boxscore
|-  style="text-align:center; background:#fbb;"
| 67 || June 19 || Phillies || 0–13 || Muñoz (3–2) || Fassero (5–5) || || 15,092 || 40–27 || Boxscore
|-  style="text-align:center; background:#bfb;"
| 68 || June 20 || @ Cardinals || 8–4 || Shaw (4–1) || Murphy (2–3) || Rojas (11) || 27,658 || 41–27 || Boxscore
|-  style="text-align:center; background:#fbb;"
| 69 || June 21 || @ Cardinals || 4–5 || Murphy (3–3) || Wetteland (2–5) || || 30,940 || 41–28 || Boxscore
|-  style="text-align:center; background:#bfb;"
| 70 || June 22 || @ Cardinals || 6–4 || Rueter (3–1) || Tewksbury (8–7) || Wetteland (13) || 30,257 || 42–28 || Boxscore
|-  style="text-align:center; background:#bfb;"
| 71 || June 24 || Marlins || 9–0 || Henry (4–0) || Rapp (4–3) || Rojas (12) || 25,266 || 43–28 || Boxscore
|-  style="text-align:center; background:#bfb;"
| 72 || June 25 || Marlins || 7–3 || Heredia (4–2) || Hough (5–6) || || 22,040 || 44–28 || Boxscore
|-  style="text-align:center; background:#fbb;"
| 73 || June 26 || Marlins || 1–6 || Gardner (2–2) || Martínez (6–5) || Nen (6) || 26,875 || 44–29 || Boxscore
|-  style="text-align:center; background:#bfb;"
| 74 || June 27 || Braves || 7–2 || Hill (11–3) || Maddux (10–4) || || 45,291 || 45–29 || Boxscore
|-  style="text-align:center; background:#bfb;"
| 75 || June 28 || Braves || 8–7 || Rojas (3–2) || Bedrosian (0–1) || || 40,623 || 46–29 || Boxscore
|-  style="text-align:center; background:#fbb;"
| 76 || June 29 || Braves || 2–6 || Smoltz (6–7) || Henry (4–1) || || 45,960 || 46–30 || Boxscore
|-  style="text-align:center; background:#bfb;"
| 77 || June 30 || @ Giants || 7–3 || Fassero (6–5) || Torres (2–8) || || 16,399 || 47–30 || Boxscore
|-

|-  style="text-align:center; background:#fbb;"
| 78 || July 1 || @ Giants || 7–14 || Monteleone (2–2) || Heredia (4–3) || || 40,036 || 47–31 || Boxscore
|-  style="text-align:center; background:#bfb;"
| 79 || July 2 || @ Giants || 10–9 || Hill (12–3) || Burba (0–5) || Wetteland (14) || 22,617 || 48–31 || Boxscore
|-  style="text-align:center; background:#fbb;"
| 80 || July 3 || @ Giants || 5–8 || Portugal (6–6) || Rueter (3–2) || Beck (15) || 23,567 || 48–32 || Boxscore
|-  style="text-align:center; background:#bfb;"
| 81 || July 4 || @ Dodgers || 5–1 || Henry (5–1) || Martínez (7–5) || Rojas (13) || 54,859 || 49–32 || Boxscore
|-  style="text-align:center; background:#fbb;"
| 82 || July 5 || @ Dodgers || 1–2 (10 inn.) || Valdez (1–0) || Wetteland (2–6) || || 32,449 || 49–33 || Boxscore
|-  style="text-align:center; background:#bfb;"
| 83 || July 6 || @ Dodgers || 4–2 || Scott (4–2) || Worrell (3–4) || Rojas (14) || 37,741 || 50–33 || Boxscore
|-  style="text-align:center; background:#bfb;"
| 84 || July 7 || @ Padres || 7–0 || Hill (13–3) || Ashby (4–7) || || 10,728 || 51–33 || Boxscore
|-  style="text-align:center; background:#bfb;"
| 85 || July 8 || @ Padres || 14–0 || Rueter (4–2) || Benes (6–10) || || 14,386 || 52–33 || Boxscore
|-  style="text-align:center; background:#bfb;"
| 86 || July 9 || @ Padres || 5–1 || Henry (6–1) || Sanders (3–6) || || 13,286 || 53–33 || Boxscore
|-  style="text-align:center; background:#bfb;"
| 87 || July 10 || @ Padres || 8–2 || Fassero (7–5) || Hamilton (5–4) || Rojas (15) || 15,848 || 54–33 || Boxscore
|-  style="text-align:center; background:#bbcaff;"
|align="center" colspan="10"|All-Star Break: NL def. AL at Three Rivers Stadium, 8–7 (10)
|-  style="text-align:center; background:#fbb;"
| 88 || July 14 || Giants || 3–8 || Black (3–0) || Martínez (6–7) || || 36,026 || 54–34 || Boxscore
|-  style="text-align:center; background:#fbb;"
| 89 || July 15 || Giants || 3–7 || Portugal (8–6) || Henry (6–2) || || 28,031 || 54–35 || Boxscore
|-  style="text-align:center; background:#fbb;"
| 90 || July 16 || Giants || 2–4 || Burkett (6–7) || Hill (13–4) || Beck (19) || 38,801 || 54–36 || Boxscore
|-  style="text-align:center; background:#fbb;"
| 91 || July 17 || Giants || 4–6 || Van Landingham (5–1) || Fassero (7–6) || Beck (20) || 28,245 || 54–37 || Boxscore
|-  style="text-align:center; background:#bfb;"
| 92 || July 18 || Padres || 9–2 || Rueter (5–2) || Krueger (1–2) || Scott (1) || 18,119 || 55–37 || Boxscore
|-  style="text-align:center; background:#bfb;"
| 93 || July 19 || Padres || 4–3 || Martínez (7–7) || Ashby (4–9) || Wetteland (15) || 23,773 || 56–37 || Boxscore
|-  style="text-align:center; background:#bfb;"
| 94 || July 20 || Padres || 5–2 || Henry (7–2) || Benes (6–11) || Wetteland (16) || 20,572 || 57–37 || Boxscore
|-  style="text-align:center; background:#bfb;"
| 95 || July 22 || Dodgers || 8–2 || Hill (14–4) || Astacio (6–8) || || 32,253 || 58–37 || Boxscore
|-  style="text-align:center; background:#bfb;"
| 96 || July 23 || Dodgers || 2–0 || Fassero (8–6) || Candiotti (7–5) || Wetteland (17) || 35,831 || 59–37 || Boxscore
|-  style="text-align:center; background:#bfb;"
| 97 || July 24 || Dodgers || 7–4 || Rueter (6–2) || Gross (7–7) || Wetteland (18) || 34,402 || 60–37 || Boxscore
|-  style="text-align:center; background:#bfb;"
| 98 || July 25 || @ Braves || 6–4 || Martínez (8–7) || Wohlers (7–2) || Wetteland (19) || 43,596 || 61–37 || Boxscore
|-  style="text-align:center; background:#bfb;"
| 99 || July 26 || @ Braves || 5–3 || Henry (8–2) || Maddux (13–6) || Wetteland (20) || 49,324 || 62–37 || Boxscore
|-  style="text-align:center; background:#fbb;"
| 100 || July 27 || @ Braves || 1–4 || Mercker (9–3) || Hill (14–5) || McMichael (20) || 49,333 || 62–38 || Boxscore
|-  style="text-align:center; background:#bfb;"
| 101 || July 29 || @ Marlins || 8–4 || Shaw (5–1) || Lewis (1–4) || || 39,338 || 63–38 || Boxscore
|-  style="text-align:center; background:#bfb;"
| 102 || July 30 || @ Marlins || 7–3 || Scott (5–2) || Gardner (3–4) || Wetteland (21) || 35,327 || 64–38 || Boxscore
|-  style="text-align:center; background:#bfb;"
| 103 || July 31 || @ Marlins || 13–4 || Martínez (9–7) || Weathers (8–10) || White (1) || 29,300 || 65–38 || Boxscore
|-

|-  style="text-align:center; background:#bfb;"
| 104 || August 1 || Cardinals || 3–2 (10 inn.) || Wetteland (3–6) || Rodriguez (2–5) || || 30,359 || 66–38 || Boxscore
|-  style="text-align:center; background:#bfb;"
| 105 || August 2 || Cardinals || 5–4 || Hill (15–5) || Urbani (2–7) || Wetteland (22) || 37,533 || 67–38 || Boxscore
|-  style="text-align:center; background:#bfb;"
| 106 || August 3 || Cardinals || 8–3 || Heredia (5–3) || Cormier (2–2) || || 30,541 || 68–38 || Boxscore
|-  style="text-align:center; background:#fbb;"
| 107 || August 4 || Cardinals || 3–7 || Tewksbury (12–10) || Rueter (6–3) || || 39,044 || 68–39 || Boxscore
|-  style="text-align:center; background:#bfb;"
| 108 || August 5 || @ Phillies || 5–0 || Martínez (10–7) || West (4–9) || || 33,642 || 69–39 || Boxscore
|-  style="text-align:center; background:#bfb;"
| 109 || August 6 || @ Phillies || 4–3 (11 inn.) || Wetteland (4–6) || Jones (2–4) || Shaw (1) || 41,699 || 70–39 || Boxscore
|-  style="text-align:center; background:#bfb;"
| 110 || August 7 || @ Phillies || 6–4 || Hill (16–5) || Muñoz (7–5) || Rojas (16) || 45,346 || 71–39 || Boxscore
|-  style="text-align:center; background:#bfb;"
| 111 || August 8 || @ Pirates || 3–2 || Heredia (6–3) || Cooke (4–11) || Wetteland (23) || 16,722 || 72–39 || Boxscore
|-  style="text-align:center; background:#bfb;"
| 112 || August 9 || @ Pirates || 4–3 || Rueter (7–3) || Lieber (6–7) || Wetteland (24) || 18,183 || 73–39 || Boxscore
|-  style="text-align:center; background:#bfb;"
| 113 || August 10 || @ Pirates || 4–0 || Martínez (11–7) || Neagle (9–10) || Wetteland (25) || 15,690 || 74–39 || Boxscore
|-  style="text-align:center; background:#fbb;"
| 114 || August 11 || @ Pirates || 0–4 || Smith (10–8) || Henry (8–3) || || 16,896 || 74–40 || Boxscore
|-

Games cancelled

|-  style="text-align:center; background:#bbb;"
| || August 12 || Mets || colspan=7 |Cancelled (strike)
|-  style="text-align:center; background:#bbb;"
| || August 13 || Mets || colspan=7 |Cancelled (strike)
|-  style="text-align:center; background:#bbb;"
| || August 14 || Mets || colspan=7 |Cancelled (strike)
|-  style="text-align:center; background:#bbb;"
| || August 15 || Rockies || colspan=7 |Cancelled (strike)
|-  style="text-align:center; background:#bbb;"
| || August 16 || Rockies || colspan=7 |Cancelled (strike)
|-  style="text-align:center; background:#bbb;"
| || August 17 || Rockies || colspan=7 |Cancelled (strike)
|-  style="text-align:center; background:#bbb;"
| || August 19 || @ Astros || colspan=7 |Cancelled (strike)
|-  style="text-align:center; background:#bbb;"
| || August 20 || @ Astros || colspan=7 |Cancelled (strike)
|-  style="text-align:center; background:#bbb;"
| || August 21 || @ Astros || colspan=7 |Cancelled (strike)
|-  style="text-align:center; background:#bbb;"
| || August 22 || @ Rockies || colspan=7 |Cancelled (strike)
|-  style="text-align:center; background:#bbb;"
| || August 23 || @ Rockies || colspan=7 |Cancelled (strike)
|-  style="text-align:center; background:#bbb;"
| || August 24 || @ Rockies || colspan=7 |Cancelled (strike)
|-  style="text-align:center; background:#bbb;"
| || August 26 || Astros || colspan=7 |Cancelled (strike)
|-  style="text-align:center; background:#bbb;"
| || August 27 || Astros || colspan=7 |Cancelled (strike)
|-  style="text-align:center; background:#bbb;"
| || August 28 || Astros || colspan=7 |Cancelled (strike)
|-  style="text-align:center; background:#bbb;"
| || August 29 || Cubs || colspan=7 |Cancelled (strike)
|-  style="text-align:center; background:#bbb;"
| || August 30 || Cubs || colspan=7 |Cancelled (strike)
|-  style="text-align:center; background:#bbb;"
| || August 31 || Cubs || colspan=7 |Cancelled (strike)
|-

|-  style="text-align:center; background:#bbb;"
| || September 2 || Reds || colspan=7 |Cancelled (strike)
|-  style="text-align:center; background:#bbb;"
| || September 3 || Reds || colspan=7 |Cancelled (strike)
|-  style="text-align:center; background:#bbb;"
| || September 4 || Reds || colspan=7 |Cancelled (strike)
|-  style="text-align:center; background:#bbb;"
| || September 5 || @ Cubs || colspan=7 |Cancelled (strike)
|-  style="text-align:center; background:#bbb;"
| || September 6 || @ Cubs || colspan=7 |Cancelled (strike)
|-  style="text-align:center; background:#bbb;"
| || September 7 || @ Cubs || colspan=7 |Cancelled (strike)
|-  style="text-align:center; background:#bbb;"
| || September 8 || @ Cubs || colspan=7 |Cancelled (strike)
|-  style="text-align:center; background:#bbb;"
| || September 9 || @ Reds || colspan=7 |Cancelled (strike)
|-  style="text-align:center; background:#bbb;"
| || September 10 || @ Reds || colspan=7 |Cancelled (strike)
|-  style="text-align:center; background:#bbb;"
| || September 11 || @ Reds || colspan=7 |Cancelled (strike)
|-  style="text-align:center; background:#bbb;"
| || September 12 || @ Mets || colspan=7 |Cancelled (strike)
|-  style="text-align:center; background:#bbb;"
| || September 13 || @ Mets || colspan=7 |Cancelled (strike)
|-  style="text-align:center; background:#bbb;"
| || September 14 || @ Mets || colspan=7 |Cancelled (strike)
|-  style="text-align:center; background:#bbb;"
| || September 16 || Pirates || colspan=7 |Cancelled (strike)
|-  style="text-align:center; background:#bbb;"
| || September 17 || Pirates || colspan=7 |Cancelled (strike)
|-  style="text-align:center; background:#bbb;"
| || September 18 || Pirates || colspan=7 |Cancelled (strike)
|-  style="text-align:center; background:#bbb;"
| || September 19 || Phillies || colspan=7 |Cancelled (strike)
|-  style="text-align:center; background:#bbb;"
| || September 20 || Phillies || colspan=7 |Cancelled (strike)
|-  style="text-align:center; background:#bbb;"
| || September 21 || Phillies || colspan=7 |Cancelled (strike)
|-  style="text-align:center; background:#bbb;"
| || September 22 || Phillies || colspan=7 |Cancelled (strike)
|-  style="text-align:center; background:#bbb;"
| || September 23 || @ Cardinals || colspan=7 |Cancelled (strike)
|-  style="text-align:center; background:#bbb;"
| || September 24 || @ Cardinals || colspan=7 |Cancelled (strike)
|-  style="text-align:center; background:#bbb;"
| || September 25 || @ Cardinals || colspan=7 |Cancelled (strike)
|-  style="text-align:center; background:#bbb;"
| || September 26 || Marlins || colspan=7 |Cancelled (strike)
|-  style="text-align:center; background:#bbb;"
| || September 27 || Marlins || colspan=7 |Cancelled (strike)
|-  style="text-align:center; background:#bbb;"
| || September 28 || Marlins || colspan=7 |Cancelled (strike)
|-  style="text-align:center; background:#bbb;"
| || September 29 || Marlins || colspan=7 |Cancelled (strike)
|-  style="text-align:center; background:#bbb;"
| || September 30 || Braves || colspan=7 |Cancelled (strike)
|-

|-  style="text-align:center; background:#bbb;"
| || October 1 || Braves || colspan=7 |Cancelled (strike)
|-  style="text-align:center; background:#bbb;"
| || October 2 || Braves || colspan=7 |Cancelled (strike)
|-

Season standings

Record vs. opponents

Notable transactions
 April 8, 1994: Juan Bell was signed as a free agent by the Expos.

Major League debuts
 Pitchers:
 Joey Eischen (Jun 19)
 Heath Haynes (Jun 1)
 Rod Henderson (Apr 19)
 Gabe White (May 27)

Roster

Player stats

Batting

Starters by position
Note: Pos = Position; G = Games played; AB = At bats; H = Hits; Avg. = Batting average; HR = Home runs; RBI = Runs batted in

Other batters
Note: G = Games played; AB = At bats; H = Hits; Avg. = Batting average; HR = Home runs; RBI = Runs batted in

Pitching

Starting pitchers
Note: G = Games pitched; IP = Innings pitched; W = Wins; L = Losses; SV = Saves; ERA = Earned run average; SO = Strikeouts; BB = Walks allowed

Other pitchers
Note: G = Games pitched; IP = Innings pitched; W = Wins; L = Losses; SV = Saves; ERA = Earned run average; SO = Strikeouts; BB = Walks allowed

Relief pitchers
Note: G = Games pitched; IP = Innings pitched; W = Wins; L = Losses; SV = Saves; ERA = Earned run average; SO = Strikeouts; BB = Walks allowed

Award winners
 Felipe Alou, Associated Press Manager of the Year
 Felipe Alou, The Sporting News Manager of the Year Award

65th Major League Baseball All-Star Game
All-Star Game
Moisés Alou, National League outfield, reserve
Wil Cordero, National League shortstop, reserve
Darrin Fletcher, National League catcher, reserve
Marquis Grissom, National League outfield, reserve
Ken Hill, National League pitcher, reserve

Farm system

References

External links
 1994 Montreal Expos team page at Baseball Reference
 1994 Montreal Expos team page at www.baseball-almanac.com

Montreal Expos seasons
Montreal Expos season
1990s in Montreal
1994 in Quebec